Grewia bilocularis is a species of flowering plant in the family Malvaceae sensu lato or Tiliaceae or Sparrmanniaceae.
It is found only in Yemen.

References

bilocularis
Endemic flora of Socotra
Vulnerable plants
Taxonomy articles created by Polbot
Taxa named by Isaac Bayley Balfour